Nancy Ann Berryhill is the former acting Commissioner of the Social Security Administration. On March 6, 2018, the Government Accountability Office stated that as of November 17, 2017, Berryhill's status violated the Federal Vacancies Reform Act, which limits the time a position can be filled by an acting official; "[t]herefore Ms. Berryhill was not authorized to continue serving using the title of Acting Commissioner after November 16." Berryhill responded that "Moving forward, I will continue to lead the agency from my position of record, Deputy Commissioner of Operations."

On April 17, 2018, President Trump nominated Andrew Saul to the position of Commissioner of Social Security. This action allowed Berryhill to regain the title of “Acting Commissioner;" she held that position until Saul was confirmed by the United States Senate on June 4, 2019.

References 

21st-century United States government officials
Commissioners of the Social Security Administration
Living people
Year of birth missing (living people)
Trump administration personnel